Bougtob is a district in El Bayadh Province, Algeria. It was named after its capital, Bougtob, which is home to most of the district's population.

Municipalities
The district is further divided into 3 municipalities:
Bougtob
El Kheiter
Tousmouline

Districts of El Bayadh Province